UK Wallball is the governing body for the sport of Wallball in the United Kingdom.

Codes
UK Wallball oversees the sport of Wallball (also known as 1-Wall Handball) in the United Kingdom. In Northern Ireland, as GAA Handball, the governing body for Gaelic handball as well as the international codes of handball including Wallball/1-Wall handball in Ireland, operates on an all-island basis, GAA Handball governs, manages and promotes Wallball in the six counties of Ireland that form Northern Ireland.

National and international competitions

UK competitions
The top UK competition for Wallball, is the UK Open, which also serves as a stop on the European 1-Wall Tour. The UK Open is held in the Westway Sports Centre in London and is typically held in February each year.

International competitions
As with the UK competitions, there are many international Wallball competitions, the main two being the European 1-Wall Tour, of which as previously mentioned, the UK Open serves as a tour stop, and the World Handball Championships which are run every 3 years. In 2012, the 'Worlds' was held in Ireland, in the Citywest International Events Arena in Dublin. The 2015 competition was held in Calgary, Alberta, Canada. The 2018 World Championships was held in Minnesota, USA. The 2021 World Championships were due to take place in Ireland; however, the tournament was cancelled due to the COVID-19 pandemic. The two codes of handball played in the World Handball Championships are 4-Wall/'40x20' handball and Wallball/One-Wall handball.

References

Sports governing bodies in the United Kingdom
Handball sports